The szlachta was a privileged social class in the Kingdom of Poland. The term szlachta was also used for the Lithuanian nobility after the union of the Grand Duchy of Lithuania with Poland as the Polish–Lithuanian Commonwealth (Union of Lublin, 1569) and for the increasingly Polonized nobilities of territories controlled by the Polish–Lithuanian Commonwealth, including Ducal Prussia and the Ruthenian lands.

The Polish–Lithuanian Commonwealth was a semi-confederated, semi-federated monarchic republic from 1569 until 1795, comprising the Kingdom of Poland and the Grand Duchy of Lithuania. The head of state was an elected monarch. The Commonwealth's dominant social class was the nobility. This article chiefly lists the nobility's magnate segment (the wealthier nobility), as they were the most prominent, famous, and notable. These families would receive non-hereditary 'central' and Land dignities and titles under the Commonwealth law that forbade (with minor exceptions) any hereditary legal distinctions within the peerage. They would later be 'approximated' to honorary hereditary titles in the Partition period with little real-power privileges but would still be venerated among the Polish upper class and the rest of the society as 'senatorial', 'palatinal', 'castellanial' or "dignitarial' families.

"Szlachta" is the proper term for Polish nobility beginning about the 15th century. Most powerful members of szlachta were known as magnates ("magnaci" or the "magnateria" class). A Polish nobleman who lived earlier is referred to as a "rycerz" ("knight"); the class of all such individuals is the "rycerstwo" (the "chivalry" class). Most powerful members of "rycerstwo" were known as "możnowładcy" (the "moznowładztwo" class).

By family 

Below is a list of most important Polish noble (szlachta) families. The families listed are the famous magnates families - ones that had accumulated great wealth and political power, generally preserved across several centuries. Please note that this list is not intended to be a comprehensive list of all szlachta families. For the list of lesser known but still notable Polish noble families, see the corresponding category

All names are given first in the singular, then (parenthetically) in the plural.

 Borkowski (Borkowscy)
 Chodkiewicz (Chodkiewiczowie)
 Czartoryski (Czartoryscy)
 Gorczewski (Gorczewscy)
 Lanckoroński (Lanckorońscy)
 Litwicki (Litwiccy)
 Lubomirski (Lubomirscy)
 Mielzynski (Mielzynscy) .
 Ogiński (Ogińscy)
 Ostrogski (Ostrogscy)
 Ostroróg (Ostrorogowie)
 Pac (Pacowie)
 Poniatowski (Poniatowscy)
 Potocki (Potoccy)
 Radziwiłł (Radziwiłłowie)
 Sapieha (Sapiehowie)
 Sanguszko (Sanguszkowie)
 Tarnowski (Tarnowscy)
 Tęczyński (Tęczyńscy)
 Tyszkiewicz (Tyszkiewiczowie)
 Wiśniowiecki (Wiśniowieccy)
 Zamoyski (Zamoyscy)
  Żeleński (Żeleńscy)

By year of birth 
Listed below are prominent szlachta of Poland and the Grand Duchy of Lithuania, by century and year of birth.

In many cases, birth year is uncertain or unknown. Under the Commonwealth, most people—including szlachta—paid little attention to their birth dates.

15th century

 Peter Hussakowski (Ussakowski) 1448, Nobleman
 Jan Scibor Taczanowski, 15th century-1468, voivode 
 Jan Tarnowski, 1488–1561, hetman
 Jan Lubrański, 1456–1520, bishop
 Jan Łaski, 1456–1531, primate, archbishop
 Mikołaj Kamieniecki, 1460–1515, hetman
 Konstanty Ostrogski, 1460–1530, hetman
 Krzysztof Szydłowiecki, 1467–1532, chancellor
 Michał Gliński, 1470–1534, prince
 Jan Feliks "Szram" Tarnowski, 1471–1507, castellan, voivode
 Jan Stawicki, 1473–1510, voivode, starost of Didnia
 Jan "Ciężki" Tarnowski, 1479–1527, castellan, starost
 Tiedemann Giese, 1480–1560, bishop
 Barbara Kola, 1480–1560
 Jerzy Radziwiłł, 1480–1541, hetman, voivode, castellan, marshal
 Jan Tęczyński, 1485–1553, Court Marshall
 Piotr Gamrat, 1487–1545, bishop
 Stanisław Kostka, 1487–1555, castellan, podskarbi
 Jan Łaski, 1499–1560, philosopher
 Barbara Kiszka, 15th century-1513
 Mikołaj Firlej, 15th century-1526, voivode, hetman
 Nicolaus Wasilewski 1489-1542 Nobleman
 Andrzej Tarło, 15th century-1531, chorąży
 Jan Tarło, 15th century-1550, krajczy, podczaszy, cześnik
 Piotr Firlej, 15th century-1553, voivode
 Mikołaj Mielecki, 15th century-1585, hetman, voivode
 Petraszka Lanevicz-Mylski 15th century, nobleman

16th century

 Andrzej Frycz Modrzewski (ca. 1503–1572) scholar, humanist and theologian
 Mikołaj Rej, 1505–1568, writer
 Stanisław Odrowąż, 1509–1545, castellan, voivode
 Jerzy Jazłowiecki, 1510–1575, hetman
 Marcin Kromer, 1512–1589, Prince-Bishop
 Mikołaj "the Red" Radziwiłł, 1512–1584, hetman, kanclerz (chancellor)
 Mikołaj "the Black" Radziwiłł, 1515–1565, marshal, chancellor, palatine
 Barbara Radziwiłł, 1520–1550, queen
 Jan Firlej, 1521–1574, marshall, starost
 Konstanty Wasyl Ostrogski, 1526–1608, voivode
 Radziwill Butwilowicz, 1526
 Jan Tarło, 1527–1587, castellan, voivode
 Michał Wiśniowiecki, 1529–1584, castellan
 Jan Kostka, 1529–1581, voivode
 Grzegorz Branicki, c.1534–1595, łowczy of Kraków, starost of Niepołomice
 Zofia Tarnowska, 1534–1570
 Jan Krzysztof Tarnowski, 1537–1567, castellan
 Sebastian Lubomirski, 1539–1613, castellan
 Zofia Odrowąż, 1540–1580
 Jan Opaliński, 1546–1598
 Mikołaj VII Radziwiłł, 1546–1589, chambelain
 Krzysztof Mikołaj "the Lightning" Radziwiłł, 1547–1603, hetman
 Stanisław Żółkiewski, 1547–1620, hetman, catellan, chancellor
 Mikołaj Krzysztof "the Orphan" Radziwiłł, 1549–1616, voivode
 Marek Sobieski, 1549–1605, voivode
 Stanisław Kostka, 1550–1568, saint
 Jan Tarnowski, 1550–1605, archbishop
 Stanisław Stadnicki, 1551–1610
 Jan Kiszka, 1552–1592
 Andrzej Leszczyński, 1553–1606, starost of Nakło, voivode of Brześć Kujawski
 Mikołaj Zebrzydowski, 1553–1620, voivode
 Janusz Ostrogski, 1554–1620, castellan, voivode
 Adam Sędziwój Czarnkowski, 1555–1628, voivode
 Jan Zbigniew Ossoliński, 1555–1628, King's secretary
 Aleksander Koniecpolski, 1555–1609, voivode
 Jerzy Radziwiłł, 1556–1600, bishop
 Lew Sapieha, 1557–1633, hetman, voivode
 Stanisław Krasiński, 1558–1617, voivode
 Jan Karol Chodkiewicz, 1560–1621, hetman
 Katarzyna Ostrogska, 1560–157
 Krystyna Radziwiłł, 1560–1580
 Mikołaj Spytek Ligęza, 1562–1637, castellan
 Zygmunt Tarło, 1562–1628, castellan
 Marcin Kazanowski, 1563/1566–1636, hetman, chancellor, voivode
 Zygmunt Kazanowski, 1563–1634, starost, courth marshall and chamberlain
 Konstanty Wiśniowiecki, 1564–1641, voivode
 Barbara Tarnowska, 1566–1610
 Adam Wiśniowiecki, 1566–1622
 Jan Szczęsny Herburt, 1567–1616, starost
 Jan Piotr Sapieha, 1569–1611, starosta uświacki, pułkownik królewski
 Janusz Skumin Tyszkiewicz, 1570–1642, voivode, writer
 Aleksander Ostrogski, 1571–1603, voivode
 Daniel Naborowski, 1573–1640, poet
 Jerzy Zbaraski, 1573–1631, castellan
 Anna Kostka, 1575–1635
 Katarzyna Kostka, 1575–1648
 Adam Hieronim Sieniawski, 1576–1616, starost, podczaszy
 Grzegorz IV Radziwiłł, 1578–1613, castellan
 Rafał Leszczyński, 1579–1636, voivode
 Janusz Radziwiłł, 1579–1620, castellan
 Stanisław "Rewera" Potocki, 1579–1667, hetman
 Aleksander Józef Lisowski, 1580–1616, mercenary commander
 Szymon Okolski, 1580–1653, historian, priest
 Jakub Sobieski, 1580/88-1646, voivode
 Krzysztof Zbaraski, 1580–1628, koniuszy, ambassador
 Hieronim Morsztyn, 1581–1623, poet
 Jan Opaliński, 1581–1637, voivode of Poznań
 Łukasz Opaliński, 1581–1654, voivode
 Jan Tęczyński, 1581–1637, voivode of Kraków
 Jakub Zadzik, 1582–1642, bishop and chancellor
 Stanisław Lubomirski, 1583–1649
 Zofia Czeska, 1584–1650, nun
 Piotr Gembicki, 1585–1657, chancellor
 Krzysztof II Radziwiłł, 1585–1640, hetman
 Szymon Starowolski, 1585–1650, priest, writer
 Samuel Korecki, 1586–1622
 Piotr Opaliński, 1586–1624
 Kasper Doenhoff, 1587–1645, voivode
 Krzysztof Ossoliński, 1587–1645, voivode
 Stefan Pac, 1587–1640, chancellor
 Mikołaj Firlej, 1588–1635, wojewoda sandomierski
 Marina Mniszech, 1588–1614
 Samuel Łaszcz, 1588–1649, starosta, (warchoł means brawler, barrator)
 Albrycht Władysław Radziwiłł, 1589–1636, castellan
 Jan Stanisław Sapieha, 1589–1635, Chancellor of Lithuania from 1621–1635, childless
 Stanisław Koniecpolski, 1590/1594–1646, hetman
 Jakub Sobieski, 1590–1646, voivode
 Janusz Tyszkiewicz Łohojski, 1590–1649, voivode
 Andrzej Bobola, 1591–1657, jesuit, martyr, saint
 Zygmunt Karol Radziwiłł, 1591–1642, voivode
 Krzysztof Arciszewski, 1592–1656, General of Artillery
 Mikołaj Ostroróg, 1593–1651, sejm marshal
 Jan Karol Tarło, 1593–1645, castellan
 Aleksander Ludwik Radziwiłł, 1594–1654, voivode
 Bogdan Chmielnicki, 1595–1657, hetman
 Jerzy Ossoliński, 1595–1650, voivode and chancellor
 Mikołaj Potocki, 1595–1651, castellan, hetman
 Albrycht Stanisław Radziwiłł, 1595–1656, chancellor
 Stanisław Lanckoroński, 1597–1657, voivode
 Janusz Wiśniowiecki, 1598–1636, starost, koniuszy
 Adam Kazanowski, 1599–1649
 Stefan Czarniecki, 1599–1665, hetman
 Barbara Lubomirska, 16th century-?
 Paweł Tarło, 16th century-1565, bishop
 Jan Tarło, 16th century-1571
 Samuel Zborowski, 16th century-1584
 Stanisław Lubomirski, 16th century-1585
 Mikołaj Firlej, 16th century-1588
 Krzysztof Kosiński, 16th century-1593
 Jan Tęczyński, 16th century-1583, castellan, podkomorzy
 Stanisław Tarło 16th century-1600, starost
 Mikołaj Firlej, 16th century-1601, wojewoda krakowski
 Fiodor Trubecki, 16th century-1608, prince
 Joachim Lubomirski, 16th century-1610, starost
 Katarzyna Lubomirska, 16th century-1611
 Jerzy Mniszech. 16th century-1613, voivode
 Michał Wiśniowiecki, 16th century-1616, castellan
 Wigund-Jeronym Trubecki, 16th century-1634, prince
 Henryk Firlej, 16th century-1626, bishop
 Krzysztof Wiesiołowski, 16th century-1637, marshal
 Anna Branicka, 16th century-1639
 Aleksander Korwin Gosiewski, 16th century-1639
 Zofia Krasińska, 16th century-1642
 Katarzyna Potocka, 16th century-1642
 Piotr Trubecki, 16th century-1644, podkomorzy, chamberlain
 Krystyna Lubomirska, 16th century-1645
 Stanisław Kazanowski, 16th century-1648
 Konstancja Ligęza, 16th century-1648
 Krzysztof Chodkiewicz, 16th century-1652, castellan, voivode
 Jan Kazimierz Umiastowski, 16th century - 1659, sejm marshal
 Samuel Twardowski, 16th century (1590s) - 1661, writer

17th century

 Marianna Wiśniowiecka, 1600-1624
 Anna Eufrozyna Chodkiewicz, 1600–1631
 Adam Kisiel, 1600–1653, voivode
 Janusz Kiszka, 1600–1653
 Kazimierz Siemienowicz, 1600–1651, general, scientist
 Katarzyna Ostrogska, 1602–1642
 Prokop Sieniawski, 1602–1626, chorąży
 Marcin Kalinowski, ca. 1605–1652, field crown hetman, voivode
 Dominik Aleksander Kazanowski, 1605–1648, voivode
 Andrzej Leszczyński, 1606–1651, voivode
 Jan Kazimierz Krasiński, 1607–1669, voivode
 Andrzej Trebicki, 1607–1679, bishop
 Andrzej Leszczyński, 1608–1658, chancellor and primate
 Paweł Jan Sapieha, 1609–1665, voivode
 Aleksander Sielski, 1610-1682, Marshal, Castellan, Chamberlain, Envoy
 Krzysztof Opaliński, 1611–1655, voivode
 Bogusław Leszczyński, 1612–1659, starost
 Łukasz Opaliński, 1612–1666
 Hieronim Radziejowski, 1612–1667, chancellor
 Janusz Radziwiłł 1612–1655, hetman, voivode
 Jeremi Wiśniowiecki, 1612–1651, voivode
 Kazimierz Franciszek Czarnkowski, 1613–1656
 Mikołaj Krzysztof Sapieha, 1613–1639, voivode
 Bogusław Leszczyński, 1614–1659
 Aleksander Michał Lubomirski, 1614–1677
 Jan Kazimierz Chodkiewicz, 1616–1660, castellan of Vilna
 Jerzy Sebastian Lubomirski, 1616–1667
 Władysław Dominik Zasławski, 1616–1656, voivode
 Anna Krystyna Lubomirska, 1618–1667
 Konstancja Lubomirska, 1618–1646
 Andrzej Potocki, 1618–1663. voivode
 Aleksander Koniecpolski Junior, 1620–1659, voivode, starost, chorazy
 Konstanty Jacek Lubomirski, 1620–1663, starost
 Bogusław Radziwiłł, 1620–1669
 Andrzej Maksymilian Fredro, 1620–1679, writer
 Wincenty Korwin Gosiewski, 1620–1662
 Krzysztof Grzymułtowski, 1620–1687, voivode
 Krzysztof Zygmunt Pac, 1621–1684, chancellor
 Jan Andrzej Morsztyn, 1621–93, poet
 Wacław Potocki, 1621–1696, poet, writer
 Adam Hieronim Sieniawski, 1623–1650, starost
 Wincenty Gosiewski, 1625–1662
 Michał Kazimierz Radziwiłł, 1625–1680, hetman, chancellor
 Marek Sobieski, 1628–1652, starost
 Jan III Sobieski, 1629–1696, king
 Stefan Bidziński, 1630–1704, voivode
 Jan Chryzostom Pieniążek, 1630–1712, voivode
 Feliks Kazimierz Potocki, 1630–1702, hetman
 Jan Wielopolski, 1630–1688, chancellor
 Dymitr Jerzy Wiśniowiecki, 1631–1682, hetman, voivode
 Stanisław Jan Jabłonowski, 1634–1702, hetman
 Jan Chryzostom Pasek, 1636–1701, soldier and writer,
 Jan Kazimierz Sapieha the Younger, ca. 1637/1642–1720, since 1700 held the title of a Duke. Since 1681 Field Hetman of Lithuania, the following year he also became the voivod of Vilna. In 1682 promoted to Grand Hetman of Lithuania.
 Józef Karol Lubomirski, 1638–1702, marshal, koniuszy, starost
 Jerzy Franciszek Kulczycki, 1640–1694
 Michał Korybut Wiśniowiecki, 1640–1673, king
 Stanisław Herakliusz Lubomirski, 1642–1702, marshall, starost
 Jan Karol Opaliński, 1642–1695, castellan of Poznań, starost
 Stanisław Mateusz Rzewuski, 1642–1728, voivode
 Marianna Kazanowska, 1643–1687
 Dominik Radziwiłł, 1643–1697, chancellor
 Katarzyna Sobieska, 1643–1694
 Cecylia Maria Radziwiłł, 1643–1682
 Dominik Mikołaj Radziwiłł, 1643–1697, chancellor
 Teresa Chodkiewicz, 1645–1672
 Mikołaj Hieronim Sieniawski, 1645–1683, hetman
 Hieronim Augustyn Lubomirski, 1647–1706, hetman
 Rafał Leszczyński, 1650–1703
 Teofila Ludwika Zasławska, 1650-1709
 Stanisław Antoni Szczuka, 1652–1710, chancellor
 Jerzy Dominik Lubomirski, 1654–1727, voivode
 Teresa Lubomirska, 1658–1712
 Anna Jabłonowska, 1660–1727
 Bogusław Korwin Gosiewski, 1660-1744
 Andrzej Taczanowski, c. 1660-18th century, knight commander 1683 Battle of Vienna
 Teodor Andrzej Potocki, 1664–1738, primate
 Adam Mikołaj Sieniawski, 1666–1726, hetman
 Jakub Ludwik Sobieski, 1667–1737, crown-prince
 Elżbieta Lubomirska, 1669–1729
 Karol Stanisław Radziwiłł, 1669–1719, koniuszy, chancellor
 Michał Franciszek Sapieha, 1670-1700
 Stanisław Ernest Denhoff, 1673–1728, hetman
 Stanisław Chomętowski, 1673–1728, hetman
 Florian Pacanowski, 1673–1725, ambassador
 Józef Potocki, 1673–1752, hetman
 Kazimierz Czartoryski, 1674–1741
 Józef Lubomirski, 1676–1732, voivode
 Franciszek Maksymilian Ossoliński, 1676–1756, treasurer, zupnik, starost
 Stanisław Poniatowski, 1676–1762
 Teresa Kunegunda Sobieska, 1676–1730
 Zygmunt Unrug, 1676–1732, starosta, chamberlain, ambassador to Prussia
 Stanisław Leszczyński, 1677–1766, king
 Aleksander Benedykt Sobieski, 1677–1714, prince
 Jan Fryderyk Sapieha, 1680–1751, Grand Recorder of Lithuania between 1706 and 1709, since 1716 the castellan of Troki and after 1735 the Grand Chancellor of Lithuania
 Konstanty Władysław Sobieski, 1680–1726, prince
 Michał Serwacy Wiśniowiecki, 1680–1744, chancellor, hetman
 Franciszek Bieliński, 1683–1766, marshal, voivode
 Teodor Lubomirski, 1683–1745
 Jan Tarło, 1684–1750, voivode
 Jerzy Ignacy Lubomirski, 1687–1753
 Jan Klemens Branicki, 1689–1771, magnate, hetman, castellan
 Stefan Garczyński, voivode of Poznań, writer
 Aleksander Dominik Lubomirski, 1693–1720
 Marianna Lubomirska, 1693–1729
 Katarzyna Barbara Radziwiłł, 1693–1730
 Mikołaj Krzysztof Radziwiłł, 1695–1715, podstoli, starost
 Andrzej Stanisław Załuski, 1695–1758, bishop
 Michał Fryderyk Czartoryski, 1696–1775, castellan, chancellor
 August Aleksander Czartoryski, 1697–1782
 Maria Zofia Sieniawska, 1698–1771, countess
 Jerzy Detloff Fleming, 1699–1771

 Zuzanna Korwin Gosiewska, 17th century-1660
 Helena Tekla Lubomirska, 17th century-1687
 Krystyna Lubomirska, 17th century-1669
 Wiktoria Elżbieta Potocka, 17th century-1760
 Aleksander Michał Lubomirski, 17th century-1673
 Stanisław Koniecpolski, 17th century-1682, voivode
 Jan Wielopolski, 17th century-1688, castellan, voivode
 Andrzej Potocki, 17th century-1692
 Franciszek Sebastian Lubomirski, 17th century-1699
 Anna Krystyna Lubomirska, 17th century-1701
 Teresa Korwin Gosiewska, 17th century-1708
 Jan Dobrogost Krasiński, 17th century-1717
 Jan Aleksander Koniecpolski, 17th century-1719, voivode, starosta
 Franciszek Lubomirski, 17th century-1721
 Józef Potocki, 17th century-1723, starost
 Jan Kazimierz Sapieha the Elder 17th century–1730, Grand Hetman of Lithuania
 Jan Szembek, 17th century-1731, chancellor
 Franciszek Wielopolski, 17th century–-1732, voivode
 Aleksander Jan Jabłonowski, 17th century-1733
 Jerzy Aleksander Lubomirski, 17th century-1735
 Anna Lubomirska, 17th century-1736
 Jan Lubomirski, 17th century-1736
 Antoni Benedykt Lubomirski, 17th century-1761
 Krystyna Branicka, 17th century-1767

18th century

 Konstancja Czartoryska, 1700–1759
 Michał Józef Massalski, c. 1700–1768, hetman
 Franciszek Salezy Potocki, 1700–1772, voivode
 Jan Wielopolski, 1700–1773, voivode
 Michał Kazimierz "Rybeńko" Radziwiłł, 1702–176, hetman, castellan
 Maria Klementyna Sobieska, 1702–1735, crown princess
 Józef Andrzej Załuski, 1702–1774, bishop
 Maria Leszczyńska, 1703–1768, princess
 Wladyslaw Aleksander Lubienski, 1703-1767, archbishop of Lwow and primate of Poland
 Stanisław Lubomirski, 1704–1793, voivode
 Michał Grocholski, 1705–1765, cześnik
 Wacław Rzewuski, 1705–1779, hetman
 Marianna Jabłonowska, 1708–1765
 Franciszek Ferdynant Lubomirski, 1710–1747
 Józef Aleksander Jabłonowski, 1711–1777, voivode
 Walenty Łukawski,–1773
 Mikołaj Bazyli Potocki, 1712–1782, starost
 Andrzej Mokronowski, 1713–1784, voivode
 Adam Tarło, 1713–1744, voivode
 Hieronim Florian Radziwiłł, 1715–1760, podczaszy, starost
 Kajetan Sołtyk, 1715–1788, bishop
 Barbara Sanguszko, 1718-1791, duchess, writer and philanthropist
 Antoni Lubomirski, 1718–1782, voivode
 Zofia Lubomirska, 1718–1790
 Kazimierz Poniatowski, 1721–1800, podkomorzy
 Jacek Jezierski, 1722–1805
 Stanisław Lubomirski, 1722–1782, prince
 Celestyn Czaplic, 1723–1803, podczaszy, podkomorzy, koniuszy
 Kazimierz Krasiński, 1725–1802
 Piotr Ożarowski, 1725–1794, hetman
 Ignacy Jakub Massalski, 1726–1794, bishop
 Antonina Czartoryska, 1728–1746, princess
 Anna Luiza Mycielska, 1729–1771
 Joachim Chreptowicz, 1729–1812, physiocrat, last Grand Chancellor of Lithuania,
 Franciszek Ksawery Branicki, 1730–1819, magnate, hetman
 Franciszek Grocholski, 1730–1792
 Maria Karolina Lubomirska, 1730–1795
 Izabella Poniatowska, 1730–1801
 Aniela Miączyńska, 1731-?
 Antoni Barnaba Jabłonowski, 1732–1799
 Tomasz Sołtyk, 1732–1808, castellan
 Stanisław August Poniatowski, 1732–1798, king
 Adam Naruszewicz, 1733–1798, writer, bishop
 Adam Kazimierz Czartoryski, 1734–1823, prince
 Stanisław Potocki, 1734–1802, starost, krajczy
 Karol Stanisław "Panie Kochanku" Radziwiłł, 1734–1790, prince, voivode
 Ignacy Krasicki, 1735–1801, bishop, writer
 Tomasz Adam Ostrowski, 1735–1817, castellan
 Andrzej Poniatowski, 1735–1773
 Elżbieta Czartoryska, 1736–1816
 Stanisław Małachowski, 1736–1809
 Michał Jerzy Poniatowski, 1736–1794, archbishop
 Józef Mikołaj Radziwiłł, 1736–1813, voivode
 Elżbieta Czartoryska, 1736–1816, princess
  1737-1798, starościna
 Jacek Małachowski, 1737–1821
 Tadeusz Franciszek Ogiński, 1737–1783, voivode
 Stanisław Ferdynand Rzewuski, 1737–1786
 Józef Klemens Czartoryski, 1740–1810
 Szymon Marcin Kossakowski, 1741–1794
 Michał Jerzy Mniszech, 1742–1806, marshal
 Tadeusz Rejtan, 1742–1780
 Seweryn Rzewuski, 1743–1811, hetman
 Michał Hieronim Radziwiłł, 1744–1831
 Maria Ludwika Rzewuska, 1744–1816
 Kazimierz Pułaski, 1745–1779
 Ignacy Wyssogota Zakrzewski, 1745–1802
 Izabela Fleming, 1746–1835, countess
 Tadeusz Kościuszko, 1746–1817, general
 Józef Maksymilian Ossoliński, 1748–1829
 Maciej Radziwiłł, 1749–1800, podkomorzy
 Hugo Kołłątaj, 1750–1812, chancellor
 Roman Ignacy Potocki, 1750–1809
 Karol Antoni Ussakowski 1750-1825, voivode
 Józefina Amalia Mniszech, 1752–1798
 Józef Zajączek, 1752–1826, general
 Stanisław Szczęsny Potocki, 1753–1805, voivode
 Stanisław Sołtyk, 1753–1831
 Ignacy Działyński, 1754–1797, military officer
 Stanisław Poniatowski, 1754–1833
 Jan Henryk Dąbrowski, 1755–1818, Polish general
 Gertruda Komorowska, 1755–1771
 Elżbieta Lubomirska, 1755–1783, princess
 Jan Krasiński, 1756–1790
 Stanisław Kostka Potocki, 1757–1821
 Kazimierz Nestor Sapieha, 1757–1798, artillery general
 Kazimierz Jordan-Rozwadowski, 1757–1836, Polish Patriot
 Julian Ursyn Niemcewicz, 1758–1841, writer
 Feliks Lubienski, 1758-1848, minister of justice, count
 Józef Kajetan Ossoliński, 1758–1834, castellan
 Władysław Franciszek Jabłonowski, 1769–1802
 Hieronim Wincenty Radziwiłł, 1759–1786, podkomorzy
 Dominik Dziewanowski, 1759–1827, Virtuti Militari
 Dorota Barbara Jabłonowska, 1760–1844
 Aleksandra Lubomirska, 1760–1836
 Konstancja Małgorzata Lubomirska, 1761–1840
 Stanisław Mokronowski, 1761–1821, general
 Antoni Protazy Potocki, 1761–1801, capitalist and industrialist
 Jan Potocki, 1761–1815
 Karol Kniaziewicz, 1762–1842
 Józef Antoni Poniatowski, 1763–1813, prince
 Julia Lubomirska, 1764–1794
 Michał Kleofas Ogiński, 1765–1833, insurrectionist and composer
 Jan Henryk Wołodkowicz, 1765–1825
 Tekla Teresa Lubienska, 1767-1810, dramatist and translator
 Eustachy Erazm Sanguszko, 1768–1844
 Adam Jerzy Czartoryski, 1770–1861, prince
 Jan Krukowiecki, 1772–1850
 Konstanty Adam Czartoryski, 1773–1860
 Rajmund Rembieliński, 1774–1820
 Antoni Radziwiłł, 1775–1833
 Ludwik Pac, 1778–1835
 Aleksander Stanisław Potocki, 1778–1845, castellan
 Michał Gedeon Radziwiłł, 1778–1850
 Klementyna Czartoryska, 1780–1852
 Zofia Czartoryska, 1780–1837
 Antoni Potocki, 1780–1850, castellan
 Jan Kozietulski, 1781–1821
 Wincenty Krasiński, 1782–1858
 Antoni Jan Ostrowski, 1782–1845, castellan, general
 Władysław Grzegorz Branicki, 1783–1843
 Alfred Wojciech Potocki, 1785–1862, ochmistrz of Galicia
 Edward Raczyński, 1786–1845
 Dominik Hieronim Radziwiłł, 1786–1813
 Józefina Maria Czartoryska, 1787–1862
 Artur Potocki, 1787–1832
 Dezydery Chłapowski, 1788–1879, general
 Marie, Countess Walewski, 1789–1817
 Zofia Branicka, 1790–1879
 Władysław Ostrowski, 1790–1869
 Roman Sołtyk, 1790–1843
 Sir Paweł Edmund Strzelecki, 1797–1873, explorer
 Anna Zofia Sapieha, 1799–1864
 Stanisław Potocki, 18th-century-1760, voivode
 Anna Lubomirska, 18th-century-1763
 Józef Sawa-Caliński, 18th-century-1771
 Chajka, 18th-century-1781
 Ludwika Lubomirska, 18th-century-1829
 Józef Makary Potocki, 18th-century-1829

19th century

 Roman Sanguszko, 1800–1881
 Ewelina Hańska, 1801–1882
 Władysław Hieronim Sanguszko, 1803–1870
 Aleksander Wielopolski, 1803–1877
 Leon Sapieha, 1803–1878
 Przemysław Potocki, 1805–1847
 Emilia Plater, 1806–1831, revolutionary
 Franciszka Ksawera Brzozowska, 1807–1872
 Delfina Potocka, 1807–1877
 Szymon Konarski, 1808–1839, revolutionary
 Alexandre Joseph Count Colonna-Walewski, 1810–1868
 Antoni Patek, 1811–1877
 Agenor Gołuchowski, 1812–1875
 Kazimierz Gzowski, 1813–1898, engineer
 Tomasz Chołodecki, 1813–1880, political activist
 Edmund Bojanowski, 1814–1871, beatified by Pope John Paul II
 Alfons Antoni Graf Taczanowski, 1815-1867, count
 Celestyn Chołodecki 1816–1867
  1816-1879, magnate, financier, philanthropist
 Alfred Józef Potocki, 1817–1889, sejm marshal, prime minister of Austria–Hungary
 Wladyslaw Taczanowski 1819-1890, famed zoologist/ornithologist
 Eliza Branicka, 1820–1876, wife 
 Edmund Taczanowski, 1822-1879, Polish general, insurrectionist
 Witold Czartoryski, 1824–1865
 Katarzyna Branicka, 1825–1907
 Wladislaw Taczanowski, 1825–1892, member of German Reichstag, representative of the "Polish Party"
 Włodzimierz Dzieduszycki, 1825–1899
 Jerzy Konstanty Czartoryski, 1828–1912
 Władysław Czartoryski, 1828–1894
 Władysław Umiastowski,1831–1905, marshal of szlachta, count
 Izabella Elżbieta Czartoryska, 1832–1899
 Maria Grocholska, 1833–1928
 Feliks Sobański, 1833-1913, marshal of szlachta, count
 Mikołaj Światopełk-Mirski, 1833–1898
 Raphael Kalinowski, 1835–1907
 Jarosław Dąbrowski, 1836-1871, military officer, Polish independence revolutionary, commander-in-chief of the 1871 Siege and Commune of Paris
 Stanisław Antoni Potocki, 1837–1884
 Stanisław Tarnowski, 1837–1917
 Konstanty Kalinowski, 1838–1864,
 Alfonsyna Miączyńska, 1838–1919
 Nester Trubecki, c.1840–1907, prince
 Eustachy Stanisław Sanguszko, 1842–1903
 Władysław Krasiński, 1844–1873
 Theodore de Korwin Szymanowski, 1846-1901, proponent of a united Europe
 Kasimir Felix Graf Badeni, 1846–1909
 Bolesław Prus, 1847–1912
 Edward Aleksander Raczyński, 1847–1926
 Agenor Maria Gołuchowski, 1849–1921
 Maria Beatrix Krasińska, 1850–1884
 Artur Władysław Potocki, 1850–1890
 Roman Potocki, 1851–1889, count
 Józef Białynia Chołodecki 1852–1934
 August Czartoryski, 1858–1893
 Witold Leon Czartoryski, 1864–1945
 Zdzisław Lubomirski, 1865–1943
 Tadeusz Jordan-Rozwadowski, 1866–1928, general, first chief of staff of the Polish Army, major contributor to victory at the Battle of Warsaw
 Jadwiga Dzieduszycka, 1867–1941
 Jan Nepomucen Potocki, 1867–1943
 Adam Stefan Sapieha, 1867–1951
 Rodryg Dunin, 1870–1928
 Maurycy Klemens Zamoyski, 1871–1939
 Waclaw Iwaszkiewicz, 1871-1922, general in the Polish-Soviet war (1919–1920)
 Adam Ludwik Czartoryski 1872–1937
 Wacław Sobieski, 1872–1935
 Paweł Trubecki, 1879–1941, prince
 Eustachy Sapieha, 1881-1963
 Karol Szymanowski, 1882-1937, composer
 Maria Ludwika Krasińska, 1883–1958
 Teresa Łubieńska, 1884-1957, social activist, WWII resistance fighter
 Alfred Niezychowski, 1888–1964
 Samuel Tyszkiewicz, 1889–1954
 Count Tadeusz Josef Żeleński, 1889-1969
 Stanisław Bohdan Grabiński, 1891–1930
 Edward Raczyński, 1891–1993, president
 Adam Zygmunt Sapieha, 1893-1970
 Stefan Tyszkiewicz, 1894-1976, inventor, car manufacturer
 Tadeusz Bór-Komorowski, 1895–1966, Polish general
 Jan Franciszek Czartoryski, 1897–1944
 Roman Jacek Czartoryski, 1898–1958
 Krzysztof Mikołaj Radziwiłł, 1898–1986
 Karolina Lanckorońska, 1898-2002
 Tadeusz Sulimirski, 1898-1983

20th century

Nobility privileges were abolished under the Second Polish Republic (1918–1939). Nobility obligations are not addressed. This would leave the legal status of nobility as consisting of obligations only had the article been not later revoked anyway.
 Jan Kanty Zamoyski, 1900-1961
 Elżbieta Czartoryska, 1905–1989
 Adam Michał Czartoryski, 1906–1998
 Augustyn Józef Czartoryski, 1907–1944
 Antoni Dunin, 1907–1939
 Piotr Michał Czartoryski, 1909–1993
 Zygmunt Kurnatowski of Lodzia. He obtained the hereditary papal title of Count from Pope Leo XIII in 1902.
 Jan Zamoyski (1912–2002), 1912–2002
 Stanisław Albrecht Radziwiłł, 1914–1976
 Sophie Moss, 1917-2009
 Michel Poniatowski, 1922-2002
 Pawel Czartoryski, 1924–1999
 Ewa Theresa Żeleńska Korab-Karpinska, 1925-2011
 Anna Branicka-Wolska, b.1924
 Elena Poniatowska, b.1932
 Beata Tyszkiewicz, b.1938
 Adam Karol Czartoryski, b.1940
 Marcin Zamoyski, b.1947
 Adam Zamoyski, b.1949
 Axel Poniatowski, b.1951
 Róża Thun, b.1954
 Konstanty Radziwiłł, b.1958
 Hubert Taczanowski, b.1960 cinematographer
 Maciej Radziwiłł, b.1961
 Alexi Lubomirski, b.1975
 Tamara Czartoryska, b.1978
 Jan Lubomirski-Lanckoroński, b.1978
 Mikołaj Rey, b.1981
 Anna Czartoryska-Niemczycka, b.1984
 Angelika Jarosławska-Sapieha, b.1990
 Sára Elżbieta Philoména Korab-Karpinska Żeleńska Eagan, b. 1999

Fictional nobles 
 Characters from Henryk Sienkiewicz's The Trilogy: Onufry Zagłoba, Andrzej Kmicic, Jan Skrzetuski, Michał Wołodyjowski
 Pan Twardowski

See also
 List of Polish titled nobility
 List of Poles
 List of Polish coats of arms
 List of Polish rulers

References

External links
 
  - Alphabetical lists
  - Alphabetical lists
  - Alphabetical lists
 Fundacja Rodziny Mielżyńskich | The Mielżyński Family Foundation

 
 
 
Szlachta

pl:Historia polskich rodów szlacheckich